Bengaluru Raptors (previously Banga Beats, Bengaluru Topguns and Bengaluru Blasters) is a franchise badminton team representing Bengaluru in the Premier Badminton League (PBL). The team is one of the six founding members of PBL (previously IBL) in 2013. The franchise was owned by the conglomerate, BOP group in 2013. In 2016, Sachin Tendulkar bought the franchise and named it after his Blasters sports franchises. In 2018, Matrix Badminton Teamworks Pvt. Ltd. took over the team and renamed it to Bengaluru Raptors.

Current squad

Seasons

2013 season

Banga Beats failed to qualify for semi-finals and finished last in the league table, with 13 points.

2017 season

2017-18 season
League Stage

Semi Final

Final

Bengaluru Blasters finished 4th in league stage, qualifying them to the semifinals where they beat the Ahmedabad Smash Masters 4 - 3. In the final tie against Hyderabad Hunters, they lost by a scoreline of 3 - 4 and ended as runners up. This was their best result in the PBL.

2018-19 season
League Stage

Semi Final

Final

Bengaluru Raptors finished 3rd in league stage with 21 points from 6 ties, qualifying them to the semifinals where they beat the Awadhe Warriors 4 - 2. In the final tie against Mumbai Rockets, they won by a scoreline of 4 - 3 To win their maiden title.

2020 season
League Stage

Semi Final

Final

Bengaluru Raptors beat Northeastern Warriors 4-2 in the finals to become champions. This made them the only team to win the PBL title twice in consecutive editions.

References

Premier Badminton League teams
Sport in Bangalore